Tazzarine (also spelled as Tazarine) is a small city and rural commune in Zagora Province, Morocco. The commune includes the small villages of Tamsahelte, Timarighin and Oum raman. The neighboring municipalities are N'kob in the northwest, Taghbalt and Ait Boudaoud. The town has about five marabout tombs. All these graves are for spiritual leadership. Nearby Tazzarine is the petroglyphs site of Ait Ouazik. These rock carvings date from approximately 5000 years BC.
According to the 2004 population estimation, the town has a population of about 13,721 people.

It features prominently in the 2006 film Babel.

Economy
Tazzarine's economy depends on agriculture, tourism and trade. In addition, many families live on the money sent by relatives working in Europe. The weekly open-air market (souk) is held Wednesday in the city center.

Demographic growth

Features

Neighboring municipalities
1. Ait Boudaoud
2. Taghbalt
3. N'kob
4. Ait Ouallal ( Ait Ouzzine)

References

Populated places in Zagora Province
Rural communes of Drâa-Tafilalet